Claire McDowell ( MacDowell; November 2, 1877 – October 23, 1966) was an American actress of the silent era. She appeared in 350 films between 1908 and 1945.

Early years
Claire MacDowell was born in New York City on November 2, 1877, the daughter of Eugene A. MacDowell and Fanny Reeves. Her aunt, actress Fanny Davenport, gave her early training in acting. Fanny Davenport's second husband was Eugene's brother Melbourne MacDowell.

Career
When she was 17, she was an understudy in a theatrical company headed by Charles Frohman. Still something of a youthful beauty, McDowell appeared in numerous short, early feature films. She graduated to playing character and mother types. She appeared in Douglas Fairbanks' The Mark of Zorro (1920). McDowell costarred in two of the biggest films of the silent era, The Big Parade and Ben-Hur: A Tale of the Christ, in which she played mothers both times. McDowell's Broadway credits included Herod (1909), To Have and to Hold (1901), and Hearts Are Trumps (1900).

When she was 38, McDowell retired, but later she returned to acting, particularly portraying mothers.

Personal life and death
She was married to silent screen character actor Charles Hill Mailes from 1906 until his death in 1937. The couple appeared in numerous silent films together, including The Mark of Zorro. They had two sons, Robert and Eugene. She died in Hollywood, California, on October 23, 1966, ten days before her 89th birthday.

Selected filmography

 The Devil (1908, Short) – Mrs. Harold Thornton
 The Planter's Wife (1908, Short) – Mrs. John Holland
 A Flash of Light (1910, Short) – At First Party
 The Lucky Toothache (1910, Short) – A Cousin
 A Mohawk's Way (1910) as Indian mother
 His Trust (1911, Short) – Colonel Frazier's Wife
 His Trust Fulfilled (1911, Short) – Mrs. Frazier
 What Shall We Do with Our Old? (1911, Short) – The Old Carpenter's Wife
 Fisher Folks (1911)
 A Decree of Destiny (1911, Short) – A Nun
 The Spanish Gypsy (1911, Short) – Paula
 The Broken Cross (1911, Short) – Kate's Mother
 The Crooked Road (1911, Short) – A Neighbor
 The Primal Call (1911, Short) – The Woman
 A Country Cupid (1911, Short) – The Half-Wit's Mother
 The Making of a Man (1911, Short) – Actress
 The Long Road (1911, Short) – Ned's Wife
 A Woman Scorned (1911, Short) – The Doctor's Wife
 As in a Looking Glass (1911) – The Wife
 Under Burning Skies (1912, Short) – A Friend
 A Temporary Truce (1912, Short) – Mexican Jim's Wife
 The Sands of Dee (1912, Short) – The Artist's Fiancée
 Two Daughters of Eve (1912, Short) – The Mother
 So Near, yet So Far (1912, Short) – Rich Woman in Other Town
 In the Aisles of the Wild (1912, Short) – The Elder Daughter
 A Sailor's Heart (1912, Short) – The Sailor's Third Sweetheart
 The New York Hat (1912, Short) – First Gossip
 A Cry for Help (1912, Short) – The Thief's Wife – the Charity Patient
 The God Within (1912, Short) – The Woodsman's Wife
 The Telephone Girl and the Lady (1913, Short) – The Lady
 A Misappropriated Turkey (1913, Short) – Mrs. Fallon
 The Wrong Bottle (1913, Short) – The Blind Sister
 The Unwelcome Guest (1913, Short) – The Wife
 A Welcome Intruder (1913, Short) – A Widow
 The Stolen Bride (1913, Short) – The Wife
 The Wanderer (1913, Short) – The Female Lover
 The Tenderfoot's Money (1913, Short) – The Prospector's Wife
 The Stolen Loaf (1913, Short) – The Rich Woman
 The House of Darkness (1913, Short) – The Doctor's Wife
 Olaf—An Atom (1913, Short) – A Parent
 The Ranchero's Revenge (1913, Short) – The Schemer's Associate
 The Well (1913, Short) – The Farmer's Wife
 The Switch Tower (1913, Short) – The Switchman's Wife
 A Gamble with Death (1913, Short) – Kate
 The Enemy's Baby (1913, Short) – Miller's Wife
 A Gambler's Honor (1913, Short) – Beth
 The Mirror (1913, Short) – Daisy
 The Vengeance of Galora (1913, Short) – Galora
 Under the Shadow of the Law (1913, Short) – John Haywood's Sister
 I Was Meant for You (1913, Short) – Lavina
 The Crook and the Girl (1913, Short) – The Uncle's Adopted Daughter
 The Strong Man's Burden (1913, Short) – Ida Glynn, The Nurse
 The Stolen Treaty (1913, Short) – Olga
 The Law and His Son (1913, Short) – Marguerite, Manning's Sister
 A Tender-Hearted Crook (1913, Short) – Edith
 The Van Nostrand Tiara (1913, Short) – Kate
 The Stopped Clock (1913, Short) – The Antique Dealer's Daughter
 The Detective's Stratagem (1913, Short) – Kate, the Bank Clerk's Sweetheart
 All for Science (1913, Short) – Detective
 A Nest Unfeathered (1914, Short) – Kate
 Her Father's Silent Partner (1914, Short)
 The Cracksman's Gratitude (1914, Short)
 The Heart of a Bandit (1915, Short)
 The Sheriff's Dilemma (1915, Short) – Molly
 The Miser's Legacy (1915, Short) – The Crook's Wife
 The Gambler's I.O.U. (1915, Short) – Nell – Daddy Wilson's Daughter
 A Day's Adventure (1915, Short) – Hogan's Moll
 The Canceled Mortgage (1915, Short) – The Widowed Mother
 Truth Stranger Than Fiction (1915, Short) – Crook
 Her Dormant Love (1915, Short) – The Discontented Wife
 The Way Out (1915, Short) – The Young School Teacher
 Her Convert (1915, Short) – The Old Inventor's Daughter
 Old Offenders (1915, Short) – Joe's Wife
 As It Happened (1915, Short) – The Ranchman's Daughter
 A Stranger from Somewhere (1916) – Olga
 Mixed Blood (1916) – Nita Valyez
 The Right to Be Happy (1916) – Mrs. Cratchit
 The White Raven (1917) – Daisy
 The Gates of Doom (1917) – Indore / Agatha
 The Bronze Bride (1917) – A-Che-Chee
 The Clean-Up (1917) – Vera Vincent
 The Empty Gun (1917, Short) – Mary
 Fighting Back (1917) – The Fury
 The Ship of Doom (1917) – Clara Gove
 The Man Above the Law (1918) – Natchah
 Captain of His Soul (1918) – Annette De Searcy
 You Can't Believe Everything (1918) – Grace Dardley
 Closin' In (1918)
 The Return of Mary (1918) – Mrs. John Denby Sr.
 The Follies Girl (1919) – Nina
 Prudence on Broadway (1919) – Miss Grayson
 Chasing Rainbows (1919) – Mrs. Walters
 Heart o' the Hills (1919) – Martha Hawn
 The Feud (1919) – Mary Lynch
 The Woman in the Suitcase (1920) – Mrs. James B. Moreland
 The Gift Supreme (1920) – Lalia Graun
 The Devil's Riddle (1920) – Mrs. Potts
 Blind Youth (1920) – Elizabeth Monnier
 Through Eyes of Men (1920) – Mrs. Virginia All
 The Jack-Knife Man (1920) – Lize Merdin
 Something to Think About (1920) – Housekeeper
 The Mark of Zorro (1920) – Doña Catalina Pulido
 Midsummer Madness (1920) – Mrs. Osborne
 Prisoners of Love (1921) – Her Mother
 Chickens (1921) – Aunt Rebecca
 What Every Woman Knows (1921) – Comtesse de la Brière
 Mother o' Mine (1921) – Mrs. Sheldon
 Wealth (1921) – Mrs. Dominick
 Love Never Dies (1921) – Liz Trott
 Rent Free (1922) – Countess de Mourney
 The Gray Dawn (1922) – Mrs. Bennett
 Penrod (1922) – Mrs. Schofield
 The Ragged Heiress (1922) – Sylvia Moreton
 The Lying Truth (1922) – Mrs. Sam Clairborne
 Nice People (1922) – Margaret Rainsford
 In the Name of the Law (1922) – Mrs. O'Hara
 Heart's Haven (1922) – May Caroline
 Quincy Adams Sawyer (1922) – Mrs. Putnam
 The West~Bound Limited (1923) – Mrs. Bill Buckley
 Michael O'Halloran (1923) – Nancy Harding
 Human Wreckage (1923) – Mrs. Brown
 Circus Days (1923) – Martha
 Ashes of Vengeance (1923) – Margot's Aunt
 Ponjola (1923) – Mrs. Hope
 Enemies of Children (1923)
 Black Oxen (1923) – Agnes Trevor
Judgment of the Storm (1924) – Mrs. Heath
 Leave It to Gerry (1924) – Mrs. Brent
 Thy Name Is Woman (1924) – Juan's Mother
 Secrets (1924) – Elizabeth Channing
 A Fight for Honor (1924) – Mrs. Hill
 Those Who Dare (1924) – Mrs. Rollins
 The Reckless Sex (1925) – Concha
 Waking Up the Town (1925) – Mrs. Joyce
 Dollar Down (1925) – Mrs. Meadows – Ruth's Sister
 The Tower of Lies (1925) – Katrina
 One of the Bravest (1925) – Mrs. Kelly
 The Big Parade (1925) – Mrs. Apperson
 The Midnight Flyer (1925) – Liza Slater
 Ben-Hur (1925) – Princess of Hur
 The Devil's Circus (1926) – Mrs. Peterson
 The Dixie Merchant (1926) – Josephine Fippany
 The Shamrock Handicap (1926) – Molly O'Shea
 The Unknown Soldier (1926) – John Phillips' sister
 The Show Off (1926) – Mom Fisher
 The Flaming Forest (1926) – Mrs. McTavish
 A Little Journey (1927) – Aunt Louise
 The Auctioneer (1927) – Mrs. Tim Eagan
 Cheaters (1927) – Mrs. Robin Carter
 The Taxi Dancer (1927) – Aunt Mary
 The Black Diamond Express (1927) – Martha Foster
 Tillie the Toiler (1927) – Ma Jones
 Winds of the Pampas (1927) – Doña Maria Casandos
 The Shield of Honor (1927) – Mrs. MacDowell
 Almost Human (1927) – Mrs. Livingston
 The Tragedy of Youth (1928) – Mother
 Don't Marry (1928) – Aunt Abigail Bowen
 4 Devils (1928) – Woman
 The Viking (1928) – Lady Editha
 Marriage by Contract (1928) – Mother
 When Dreams Come True (1929) – Martha Shelby
 The Flying Fleet (1929) – Mrs. Hastings – Anita's Mother (uncredited)
 Silks and Saddles (1929) – Mrs. Calhoun
 The Quitter (1929) – Mrs. Abbott
 Whispering Winds (1929) – Mrs. Benton
 Redemption (1930) – Anna Pavlovna
 The Second Floor Mystery (1930) – Aunt Hattie
 Young Desire (1930) – Mrs. Spencer
 The Big House (1930) – Mrs. Marlowe
 Wild Company (1930) – Mrs. Laura Grayson
 Brothers (1930) – Mrs. Bess Naughton
 Mothers Cry (1930) – Mary's Mother (uncredited)
 An American Tragedy (1931) – Mrs. Samuel Griffiths
 Under Eighteen (1931) – Seamstress (uncredited)
 Manhattan Parade (1931) – Nancy – the Maid (uncredited)
 Union Depot (1932) – Little Boy's Mother (uncredited)
 The Famous Ferguson Case (1932) – The Brookses' Landlady (uncredited)
 Rebecca of Sunnybrook Farm (1932) – Mrs. Randall (uncredited)
 Cornered (1932) – Jane's Aunt
 The Phantom Express (1932) – Ma Nolan
 A Successful Calamity (1932) – Struthers' Secretary (uncredited)
 Lawyer Man (1932) – Gilmurry's Secretary (uncredited)
 Central Airport (1933) – Mrs. Blaine
 The Working Man (1933) – Benjamin's Secretary
 By Appointment Only (1933) – Mrs. Mary Carroll
 Paddy the Next Best Thing (1933) – Miss Breen (uncredited)
 Wild Boys of the Road (1933) – Mrs. Smith
 Bedside (1934) – Nurse (uncredited)
 It Happened One Night (1934) – Mother on Bus (uncredited)
 Journal of a Crime (1934) – Sister at Hospital (uncredited)
 Dr. Monica (1934) – Miss Bryerly (uncredited)
 British Agent (1934) – Woman Saying 'Lenin will Live' (uncredited)
 Two Heads on a Pillow (1934) – Mrs. Helen Gorman
 Imitation of Life (1934) – Teacher Outside Classroom (uncredited)
 Black Fury (1935) – Nurse (uncredited)
 Murder by Television (1935) – Mrs. Houghland
 August Week End (1936) – Alma Washburne
 Small Town Girl (1936) – Woman in Bed (uncredited)
 Criminal Lawyer (1937) – Night Court Judge (uncredited)
 Two-Fisted Sheriff (1937) – Miss Herrick – Molly's Aunt
 High, Wide, and Handsome (1937) – Seamstress (uncredited)
 Test Pilot (1938) – Funeral Home Associate (uncredited)
 Three Comrades (1938) – Landlady Frau Zalewski (uncredited)
 Boys Town (1938) – Catholic Nun (uncredited)
 Stand Up and Fight (1939) – Woman (uncredited)
 Idiot's Delight (1939) – Crying Mother (uncredited)
 Miracles for Sale (1939) – Jack of Diamonds Woman (uncredited)
 Thunder Afloat (1939) – Nurse (uncredited)
 Those High Grey Walls (1939) – Mother (uncredited)
 Joe and Ethel Turp Call on the President (1939) – Gossiper (uncredited)
 Young Tom Edison (1940) – Woman at Station (uncredited)
 The Captain Is a Lady (1940) – Old Lady (uncredited)
 The Golden Fleecing (1940) – Pedestrian (uncredited)
 Dr. Kildare Goes Home (1940) – Nurse for Mr. Winslow (uncredited)
 Third Finger, Left Hand (1940) – Witness at wedding (uncredited)
 Lady Scarface (1941) – Mrs. Tuckerman (uncredited)
 Reap the Wild Wind (1942) – Ettie (uncredited)
 Keeper of the Flame (1942) – Mourner (uncredited)
 The Youngest Profession (1943) – Woman (uncredited)
 The Human Comedy (1943) – Woman on Street (uncredited)
 Hangmen Also Die! (1943) – Counterwoman (uncredited)
 Presenting Lily Mars (1943) – Dowager (uncredited)
 This Land Is Mine (1943) – Woman in Bathroom (uncredited)
 Du Barry Was a Lady (1943) – Subway Passenger (uncredited)
 Black Market Rustlers (1943) – Mrs. Prescott (uncredited)
 Teen Age (1943) – Mrs. Mary Abbott
 Men on Her Mind (1944) – Mother Goodwin
 Andy Hardy's Blonde Trouble (1944) – Dr. Standish's Servant (uncredited)
 Are These Our Parents (1944) – Miss Winfield
 The Thin Man Goes Home (1944) – Train Passenger in Passageway (uncredited)
 Having Wonderful Crime (1945) – Guest (uncredited)
 Adventure (1945) – Woman in Library (uncredited)

References

External links

1877 births
1966 deaths
American film actresses
American silent film actresses
Actresses from New York City
20th-century American actresses
American stage actresses